Federação Paulista de Futebol (FPF) is the governing body of association football within the Brazilian state of São Paulo. It was founded on 22 April 1941, and currently organises the Campeonato Paulista, the Copa São Paulo de Juniores and the Copa Paulista de Futebol, among others.

Presidents

Current clubs in Brasileirão 
List of clubs from São Paulo competing in the 2022 season across the Brazilian football league system.

See also 

 Confederação Brasileira de Futebol
 Campeonato Paulista
 Campeonato Paulista Série A2
 Campeonato Paulista Série A3
 Campeonato Paulista Segunda Divisão

References

External links 
  
 
 Paulista Football Federation at YouTube
 
 

Brazilian football state federations
 
Sports organizations established in 1941